Western Springs School District 101 is an elementary school district located in the affluent central Cook County village of Western Springs, Illinois, which is a Chicago suburb. The district is composed of four schools: three are elementary schools and one is a junior high school, and all four are located in the village of Western Springs. Students may begin their education as prekindergarteners in John Laidlaw Elementary School  or Forest Hills Elementary School, where they will remain until grade five; the principals of the schools are, respectively, Sarah L. Coffey  and D. A. Farrell. Alternatively, students may enter prekindergarten at McClure Junior High School before starting kindergarten in principal Brad Promisel's Field Park Elementary School, which accommodates its students until grade five, as with the other elementary schools. All elementary schools feed back into McClure Junior High School, where they are educated between grades six and eight under direction of principal F. Daniel Chick. The district's superintendent is Brian Barnhart.

External links
 District website

References

School districts in Cook County, Illinois